The YF-115 is a Chinese liquid rocket engine burning LOX and kerosene in an oxidizer-rich staged combustion cycle. A high efficiency/high thrust environmental-friendly rocket engine was always an objective within Programme 863. Development began in the 2000s, along with its sibling, the bigger YF-100, which would power the LM-5, LM-6 and LM-7 boosters and first stages. Testing was directed by the China National Space Administration (CNSA) commencing in 2005. Development works are mainly carried out by the Xi'an Aerospace Propulsion Institute. It will be used as upper stage engine for China's next generation of medium and light environmental-friendly launch vehicles, namely the Long March 6 and the Long March 7. During early 2012, the engine system successfully passed vacuum testing. It is China's first upper stage rocket engine to adopt the staged-combustion cycle.

In the LM-6 upper stage it will use a single YF-115 with gimbaled mount. While the LM-7 upper stage will use four such engines. But in this latter case, two engines will be fixed and two will be gimbaled.

See also
LM-6 – Rocket family that uses the YF-115.
LM-7 – Rocket family that uses the YF-115.
YF-100 – First stage Chinese rocket engine which is the technological base of the YF-115.

References

Rocket engines of China
Rocket engines using kerosene propellant
Rocket engines using the staged combustion cycle